Kimitoshi (written: 公俊 or 公利) is a masculine Japanese given name. Notable people with the name include:

, Japanese footballer
, Japanese basketball coach
, Japanese mechanical designer

Japanese masculine given names